Born Reckless may refer to:

 Born Reckless (1930 film), a 1930 American crime comedy film
 Born Reckless (1937 film), a 1937 American crime drama film
 Born Reckless (1958 film), a 1958 American Western drama film